Dragas may refer to:

 George Dragas (b. 1944), Greek-born Orthodox Christian priest in America
 Helen Dragas, American business executive

See also
 Dragaš (disambiguation)